Shearer's Foods, LLC is a U.S. manufacturer and distributor of snack foods. Founded in 1974 as Shearer's Snacks in Brewster, Ohio, the company now has factories in Ohio, Texas, Arkansas, Oregon, Virginia, Iowa, Minnesota and Ontario, with worldwide distribution.

Shearer's manufactures, warehouses, and distributes branded snacks such as Sheerer's Potato Chips as well as private label products for snack food companies and retailers. The company employs more than 3,400 people in eight facilities.

Its headquarters is located in Massillon, Ohio, and its plant in Massillon is the first food manufacturing plant in the world to achieve the highest sustainability award for environmental responsibility.

History

In the early 1900s, the Shearer family opened Shearer's Market in Canton, Ohio. The third generation, Jack Shearer and his wife, Rosemary, operated the family grocery store from the 1950s until 1976, and in 1974 bought a snack food distributorship and named it Brookside Distributing. In 1979, they began manufacturing "hand-cooked" potato chips until discovering that a kettle cooked chip provided more of a crunch and a standardized method of preparation. The Shearers hand-cooked potato chips from the kettle, packaged them in one-pound poly bags with a twist tie, delivered them from a warehouse and first sold them under the Kettle-Cook'd label.

Growth and transition

In 1982, Shearer's purchased a 20,000 square foot facility on ten acres in Brewster, Ohio. Soon after, six hand-kettles and a peanut roaster were in operation. The Grandma Shearer's logo appeared on shelves in 1983, and 3,700 pounds of potatoes were processed daily. Shearer's installed its first continuous fryer to produce up to 1,000 pounds of potato chips every hour and expanded its warehouse and maintenance space by 9,000 square feet in 1986.

In 1988, the company increased its plant size again. This growth continued through the 1990s and included the addition of a second continuous fryer, two hand-kettle fryers that featured automatic stirring systems (among the first manufactured in all of the United States), computerized combination weighers, state-of-the-snack equipment for tortilla chips and cheese curls, and an additional 100,000 square feet of space.

In the early 2000s, six hand-kettle cookers, a new potato peeling system, distribution and transfer conveyors, and a new seasoning system were installed. Thirty-three acres adjacent to the current location were purchased to combine for 77 acres in total, while a portion of the storage operation was relocated nine miles from the headquarters to Massillon.
The company was named "Snack Manufacturer of the Year" by Snack Food & Wholesale Bakery magazine in 2002 and again in 2011.

Shearer's developed a new logo, revamped packaging, and expanded its factory outlet store in 2004. A $2.6 million wastewater treatment plant was completed in the spring, and six additional hand-kettle cookers were installed along with a new packaging area, making Shearer's one of the largest manufacturers of kettle-cooked potato chips in the nation.

Recent history

An increasing trend of whole grains and better-for-you snacks resulted in three new whole grain tortilla chip products with 100% whole grain yellow corn in 2006.

 2008: unveiled plans to build the first manufacturing plant in the world to achieve the highest sustainability award for environmental responsibility
 2009: introduced two multi-SKU brands to retail, Tangos™ Tortilla Chips and Shapers™ Whole Grain Chips
 2010: acquired Snack Alliance, Inc. and its Canadian affiliate (collectively, “Snack Alliance”), a branded, contract pack and private label snack producer in North America (Founded in 2000, Snack Alliance employed over 400 associates across the United States and Canada. Snack Alliance had manufacturing operations located in Hermiston, Oregon and Bristol, Virginia that produced potato chips, tortilla chips, extruded products, popcorn, and their Riceworks brand of whole grain rice snacks.)
 May 2011: extended its line of potato chips to include zero trans fat chips, cooked in 100% canola oil
 June 2012: moved its headquarters into the four story Grand Mill Centre building in downtown Massillon, Ohio
 October 2012: was sold to Chicago-based Wind Point Partners.
 January 2015: majority stake was acquired by Ontario Teacher's Pension Plan through the purchase of additional equity stake (The private equity group had initially acquired stake in the company in 2012 alongside Wind Point Partners and in partnership with CJ Fralaigh. Since the sale in 2012, Shearer's completed acquisitions of Lance Private Brands and Medallion Foods. These acquisitions doubled the size of the business and significantly expanded private label and contract manufacturing offerings.)
 2016: acquired Barrel O' Fun, a division of KLN Family Brands located in Perham, Minnesota (The Barrel O' Fun brand includes many of the same snack items that Shearer's already produced. Shearer's now operates the Barrel O' Fun manufacturing plant and warehouse under their name and are not associated with KLN, although they share the same property. The Perham plant continues to manufacture the Barrel O' Fun brand of snacks, but now produces private label brands as well.)
 2021:  Shearer's Foods discontinued production of its own Shearer's brand snacks, in favor of private label and contract snack manufacturing.

Environmental sustainability
The company has expressed a commitment to sustainability and energy performance, joining Energy Star in 2006 and working to improve energy performance in its offices, manufacturing facilities and distribution centers. The company received recognition by way of a Crain's Cleveland Business Emerald Award for its efforts.

Their energy management program includes:

A zero waste program that calls for all facilities to send less than one percent of waste to landfills
 Recycling finished goods and wet waste for use as animal feed
 Reclamation of all potato starch for refinement as industrial lubricant
 Recycling of all used vegetable oil 
 Conversion to high efficiency T8 & T5 lighting in Brewster and Lubbock manufacturing sites, and in Navarre Distribution warehouse areas
 New oil filtration equipment to increase oil quality and eliminate rendering of oil
 Economizers on large air handling units to greatly reduce natural gas consumption during heating season 
 Wastewater management facilities that comply with state Environmental Protection Agency requirements

The company broke ground on its LEED Platinum Certified snack food manufacturing plant in 2009. The plant in Massillon, Ohio was the first manufacturing plant in the world to achieve the highest sustainability award for environmental responsibility.

Manufacturing

Manufacturing capabilities

Shearer's various products are made from potatoes, yellow, white, blue, and organic corn, and for tortilla chips, company-produced masa.  Seasonings and flavors are developed by an in-house R&D group and also in conjunction with external partners. Production capabilities include:
 hand kettles for production of kettle cooked potato chips
 continuous potato chip lines for standard, wavy and rippled chip production
 tortilla chip lines
 extruders for production of curl and puff product
 twin screw extrusion production

Products include sliced, rippled, and wavy potato chips, kettle-cooked potato chips, tortilla and whole grain extruded chips, and other extruded products such as cheese curls and puff corn (also known as hulless popcorn).

The company maintains six distribution centers in Ohio and Pennsylvania, and operates its own distribution routes, while also relying on a network of select distributors throughout the midwestern United States, New England, and parts of Canada.

Plants

 Massillon, Ohio: Headquarters; LEED manufacturing plant
 Brewster, Ohio: main manufacturing plant
 Bristol, Virginia: manufacturing plant
 Burlington, Iowa: manufacturing plant
 Fort Worth, Texas: manufacturing plant
 Guelph, Ontario: manufacturing plant
 Hermiston, Oregon: manufacturing plant (Former location.  Boiler explosion destroyed plant in early 2022.)
 Lubbock, Texas: co-pack manufacturing plant
 Newport, Arkansas: manufacturing plant
 Phoenix, Arizona: manufacturing plant
 Perham, Minnesota: manufacturing plant
 Waterford, Pennsylvania: manufacturing plant

Products
Shearer's Branded Snacks 
 Kettle Cooked Potato Chips in flavors Original, Mesquite BBQ, Sea Salt and Pepper, Sea Salt and Vinegar, Hot Pepper Jalapeño and 40% Less Fat
 Home-Style Potato Chips in Classic, Bacon-Cheddar and Rippled
 Rippled Potato Chips in flavors in Original, Sour Cream and Onion, Home Run Hot Dog (seasonal)
 Savory Potato Chips in Original, Sour Cream & Onion, Lightly Salted, Cheddar & Sour Cream and Barbeque
 Baked Cheese Curls and Krazi Curls
 Butter Puffs and Cheese Puffs
 Pretzels in Thins, Minis, Sticks and flavors Honey Wheat and Butter Twist
 Pork Rinds in flavors Original and Barbecue 
 Tortilla chips in Multigrain & Flaxseed, Fire Roasted Veggie, Blue Corn & Sesame, Deli Rounds, Bite Size, Cantina Style, Margarita Lime and Restaurant Style

Other Shearer's brands include riceworks, Granny Goose, Thin & Crispy, Brent & Sam's, Delicious Bakery, and Vista.

References

Companies based in Ohio
Snack food manufacturers of the United States
Brand name potato chips and crisps